Matthæus Yrsselius or Irsselius, the Latinized form of Mattheus van Iersel (1541–1629), was abbot of St. Michael's Abbey, Antwerp, from 1614 until his death. He was remembered as a patron of the arts and sciences.

Patronage
In 1624 he commissioned an altarpiece depicting the Adoration of the Magi from Peter Paul Rubens, paying for it in two installments of 750 guilders each in 1624 and 1626.

In 1627 the students of the Jesuit college in Antwerp put on a school play dramatizing the life of Norbert of Xanten, dedicating the production to Yrsselius.

At his death Yrsselius bequeathed a celestial and a terrestrial globe, a cosmographic sphere, and an edition of the works of St Gregory the Great to the abbey library.

References

1541 births
1629 deaths
Abbots of the Habsburg Netherlands
Members of the States of Brabant
Premonstratensians